Green v. County School Board of New Kent County, 391 U.S. 430 (1968), was an important United States Supreme Court case involving school desegregation. Specifically, the Court dealt with the freedom of choice plans created to avoid compliance with the Supreme Court's mandate in Brown II in 1955. The Court held unanimously that New Kent County's freedom of choice plan did not adequately comply with the school board's responsibility to determine a system of admission to public schools on a non-racial basis. The Supreme Court mandated that the school board must formulate new plans and steps towards realistically converting to a desegregated system. Green v. County School Board of New Kent County was a follow up of Brown v. Board of Education.

“When this opinion is handed down, the traffic light will have changed from Brown to Green.” –U.S. Supreme Court Justice William Brennan, 1968.

Green established what came to be known as the five Green factors — faculty, staff, transportation, extracurricular activities and facilities — the criteria by which later courts would evaluate school districts' progress on desegregation.

Background
In Brown v. Board of Education in 1954, the Warren Court ruled that state-sanctioned segregation of public schools was unconstitutional under the 14th Amendment. One year later, in Brown II, enforcement of this principle was given to district courts, ordering that they take the necessary steps to make admittance to public schools nondiscriminatory "with all deliberate speed." The term "all deliberate speed" did little to speed up the school board's plan for integration. Judge John J. Parker of the United States Court of Appeals for the 4th Circuit led many in the South in interpreting Brown as a charge not to segregate, but not as an order to integrate. The Supreme Court heard several more cases surrounding the speed and efficacy of desegregation between its initial ruling in Brown and the Green v. School Board case in 1968.

Factual background
Virginia had long mandated racial segregation in public education under the Virginia Constitution of 1902. 
At the time of the 1960 census, in New Kent County, Virginia, approximately half of the 4,500 residents were African American. The school system had only two schools, the New Kent School for white students and the George W. Watkins School for black students. School buses traveled overlapping routes throughout the county.

The school board continued to operate a segregated system in the wake of the Brown rulings, on the authority of several "massive resistance" state laws enacted to resist them. One such law, the Pupil Placement Act, divested local boards of authority to assign children to particular schools and centralized that power with the newly created State Pupil Placement Board. Under the act, children were automatically reassigned to their prior school each year unless they applied for transfer to another school and the board approved their application. New students' schools were also assigned by the board. White families almost uniformly chose the predominantly white school, and African-American families almost uniformly chose the predominantly black school. As of September 1964, no New Kent student had applied to the Pupil Placement Board for a transfer between the schools.

The U.S. Congress, concerned with the lack of progress nationally in school desegregation, included provisions in the Civil Rights Act of 1964 that would withhold federal funding from schools that refused to dismantle segregation.

Legal proceedings
The case was initially tried in the U.S. District Court for the Eastern District of Virginia in Richmond.
Plaintiffs filed suit in 1965 for injunctive relief against maintenance of allegedly segregated schools. In response, the Board, in order to remain eligible for federal financial aid, adopted a "freedom of choice" plan for desegregating the schools. The plan permitted students, except those entering the first and eighth grades, to choose annually between the schools; those not choosing were assigned to the school previously attended; first and eighth graders must affirmatively choose a school. In 1965, thirty-five black students enrolled in the previously all-white New Kent school. The District Court approved the plan, as amended.

More than a hundred additional African-American students enrolled each year in 1966 and 1967. The newly enrolled black students reported harassment by their white peers, to which teachers and administrators turned a blind eye.
The case was argued before the U.S. Court of Appeals for the Fourth Circuit on January 9, 1967, and decided June 12, 1967.
The Court of Appeals approved the "freedom of choice" provisions, although it remanded for a more specific and comprehensive order concerning teachers. During the plan's three years of operation, no white student chose to attend the all-African-American school, and although 115 Black pupils enrolled in the formerly all-white school, 85% of the African-American students in the system still attended the all-Black school.

Green before the Supreme Court

This case was argued during the same term as Raney v. Board of Education of Gould School District and Monroe v. Board of Commissioners of Jackson, Tenn. In the latter case, the plan in question was called "free transfer."

NAACP Legal Defense Fund lawyers Samuel W. Tucker, Jack Greenberg, Henry L. Marsh, III, James Nabrit III,    Michael Meltsner and Oliver W. Hill argued and prepared the petitioners' case, and Tucker presented their arguments. Frederick T. Gray represented the school board, and Louis F. Claiborne served as amicus curiae.

The Court noted that "freedom of choice" plans tended to be ineffective at desegregating a school system.
Although the Court did not rule that all "freedom of choice" plans were unconstitutional, it held that in New Kent County's case the freedom-of-choice plan violated the Constitution.

The Court's skepticism of New Kent's freedom of choice plan was due in part to the county's slowness: "it is relevant that this first step did not come until some 11 years after Brown I was decided and 10 years after Brown II directed the making of a 'prompt and reasonable start.' ... Moreover, a plan that, at this late date, fails to provide meaningful assurance of prompt and effective disestablishment of a dual system is also intolerable. 'The time for mere 'deliberate speed' has run out,' Griffin v. County School Board, 377 U. S. 218, 377 U. S. 234."

Impact of Green and the five "Green factors" 

To comply with the Court's mandate, the school board separated the New Kent and George Watkins schools by grade level, rather than race. The Watkins School became George Watkins Elementary School, and New Kent became New Kent High School.

In the decades following Green, courts throughout the U.S. used five criteria identified in Green, known as the five Green factors, to assess whether school systems had sufficiently desegregated. The Green factors are: (1) faculty, (2) staff, (3) transportation, (4) extracurricular activities, and (5) facilities. These five Green factors from the following text in Green, assessing New Kent's failure to integrate:

This guidance built on the Court's previous guidance from Brown II in 1955 where the Supreme Court charged the district courts to:
"consider problems related to administration arising from the physical condition of the school plant, the school transportation system, personnel, revision of school districts and attendance areas ... and revision of local laws and regulations."

50th anniversary celebration 
Several events took place in New Kent County, Virginia during May 2018 to celebrate 50 years since the Supreme Court's ruling on the case.  The Green vs County School Board of New Kent organization has a list of the events.
In 2018, the Library of Virginia honored Calvin Coolidge Green (1931–2011), pastor, soldier, educator, civil rights activist and father of named plaintiff Charles Green, as one of its Strong Men and Women.

See also
List of United States Supreme Court cases, volume 391

References

Further reading
Allen, Jody and Daugherity, Brian. "Recovering a ‘Lost’ Story Using Oral History: The United States Supreme Court's Historic Green v. New Kent County, Virginia, Decision," Oral History Review, vol. 3, issue 2, 25-45 (June 2006).
Daugherity, Brian and Bolton, Charles, editors. With All Deliberate Speed: Implementing Brown v. Board of Education. Fayetteville: University of Arkansas Press, 2008.

External links
 
The Civil Rights Movement in Virginia: The Green Decision of 1968   - Virginia Historical Society online exhibition
New Kent School and the George W. Watkins School: From Freedom of Choice to Integration - National Park Service lesson plan
Green v County School Board of New Kent Celebration (50th Anniversary Celebration of the Green v New Kent Case)

Education in New Kent County, Virginia
United States equal protection case law
History of civil rights in the United States
United States Supreme Court cases
United States school desegregation case law
1968 in United States case law
Civil rights movement case law
African-American history of Virginia
Legal history of Virginia
United States Supreme Court cases of the Warren Court